"Another Girl" is a song by the English rock band the Beatles from their 1965 album Help! and included in the film of the same title. The song was written by Paul McCartney and credited to the Lennon–McCartney partnership. The song is addressed to the singer's girlfriend, who is informed that the singer has found "another girl."

Composition and recording 
McCartney wrote the song while holidaying in Hammamet, a resort in Tunisia. With an up-tempo swing-beat that McCartney favoured ("Can't Buy Me Love", "She's a Woman") it opens with a short refrain, powered by block vocal harmonies, that segues straight into the verse, which is constructed on the blues-mode chord changes the group currently favoured. The bridge theme makes a sudden key change up a minor third from A to C (a harmonic strategy also used on the record's next track "You're Going to Lose That Girl") and features more close three-part harmonies as the aggressively sung verse's apparent threat to a jealous girl turns into a sweet tribute to the "other" girl who "will always be my friend".

The Beatles recorded the song on 15 February 1965, having also worked that day on "Ticket to Ride" and "I Need You". The backing track was quickly recorded in a single take. George Harrison added a guitar "flourish" at the end which was omitted from the final mix: McCartney added lead guitar the next day. This is one of several Beatles songs recorded at the time on which McCartney played lead guitar in addition to his usual bass. Four-track recording allowed the group to refine songs' arrangements in the studio and McCartney often had clear ideas about the guitar lines he wanted. He also contributed lead guitar to "Ticket to Ride" and played an electric guitar duet with Harrison on "The Night Before". The song was mixed down on 18 February and again on 23 February.

This song features the often-utilized three-part harmonies between Lennon, McCartney and Harrison, but it is one of the only instances in which Lennon sings the highest harmony.

McCartney said of this song and other album tracks, "It's a bit much to call them fillers because I think they were a bit more than that, and each one of them made it past the Beatles test. We all had to like it."

Live performances
The song was performed live for the first time by a Beatle when Paul McCartney returned to the Nippon Budokan, Tokyo, on 28 April 2015; this was 49 years after the Beatles had first played at the venue, in June and July 1966. In a released statement, McCartney said, "It was sensational and quite emotional remembering the first time and then experiencing this fantastic audience tonight."

In the film Help! 
In the film Help!, McCartney lip-syncs "Another Girl" while standing on a coral reef on Balmoral Island in the Bahamas, and plays a girl in a bikini as if she is a guitar. Since McCartney's hands are occupied (with either bass or girl), George Harrison mimes McCartney's guitar fills as if playing them himself. The four of them each change instruments. For instance, Harrison is seen playing McCartney's bass and looks confused. Starr is shown playing acoustic guitar and Lennon mimes playing drums.  Another scene was filmed at the Cloisters, a famous Bahamian landmark.

Cover versions 
The George Martin Orchestra covers the track on Help!, their instrumental reworking of the Beatles' album.

Berlin-based Lautten Compagney covers the track on their 2021 album "Time Travel" in an arrangement for baroque orchestra and saxophone.

Personnel 
Paul McCartney – double-tracked lead vocal, bass guitar, lead guitar
John Lennon – harmony vocal, electric rhythm guitar
George Harrison – harmony vocal, acoustic rhythm guitar
Ringo Starr – drums
Personnel per George Martin, quoted in Ryan and Kehew

Notes

References

External links 
 
 - Beatles Bible - "Another Girl"

The Beatles songs
1965 songs
Song recordings produced by George Martin
Songs written by Lennon–McCartney
Songs published by Northern Songs
Country rock songs
Rockabilly songs